Rhytiphora marmorata is a species of beetle in the family Cerambycidae. It was described by Stephan von Breuning in 1938. It is known from Australia.

References

marmorata
Beetles described in 1938